Omnigon is a role-playing game published by Omnigon Games Inc. in 1989.

Description
Omnigon is a science-fiction role-playing system. Characters can be human or one of five alien races (animal-based humanoids - lizard people, cat-people, etc.). There are six character classes: warrior, rogue, infiltrator, scout, Psionicist, and alpha knight (warriors with some psionics). Character class chosen dictates what skills are available. The game includes combat rules, equipment, and five levels of psionic abilities.

Publication history
Omnigon was designed by Dennis Craig, Scott Groves, Alan P. Widtmann, and Glenn Zaroski, and published by Omnigon Games Inc. in 1989 as a 60-page book.

Reception
Lawrence Schick called the game system "simple and rather trite".

Reviews
White Wolf #21 (June/July, 1990)

References

Role-playing games introduced in 1989
Space opera role-playing games